Religious coercion may refer to

 Blue laws, when enforcing religious standards
 Forced conversion
 Some aspects of state religion